The Marcal is a right tributary of the Rába which rises near Sümeg in the Bakony region of western Hungary.  The river flows north and reaches Ukk on the Little Hungarian Plain.  It follows a path similar to the Rába, and in many places the two rivers are only a kilometer apart. The two rivers meet at Győr.

Other 

In October 2010, the Marcal was contaminated in a chemical spill by red mud and temporarily suffered massive loss of aquatic life, from which it has since recovered.

References

External links 
 Marcal River website (in Hungarian)

Rivers of Hungary